A caster is a type of wheel.

Caster may also refer to:

Industry
Caster angle, one of the angles important to automotive suspension
Caster, a machine used in metal casting

Products
A small condiment bottle or cruet
A type of sugar
Caster (cigarette)

Fishing
Caster (maggot), a fly pupa used as bait.

People
Caster Semenya, South African runner

Fiction
Caster (Fate/stay night), an anime character
Wizard (character class), a character class who casts spells

See also 
Casting (disambiguation)
Castor (disambiguation)
Gaster (surname)
Kaster, village in West Flanders, Belgium